Harold Burton may refer to:

 Harold Hitz Burton (1888–1964), mayor of Cleveland, Ohio, member of the United States Senate and Associate Justice of the Supreme Court of the United States
 Harold W. Burton (1888–1969), early 20th century American architect
 H. David Burton (born 1938), American, the 13th Presiding Bishop of The Church of Jesus Christ of Latter-day Saints

See also
Harry Burton (disambiguation)